The men's Greco-Roman 74 kilograms is a competition featured at the 2003 World Wrestling Championships, and was held at the Palais des Sports Robert Oubron in Créteil, France from 3 to 5 October 2003.

Results
Legend
F — Won by fall

Preliminary round

Pool 1

Pool 2

Pool 3

Pool 4

Pool 5

Pool 6

Pool 7

 Aleksandr Dokturishvili was disqualified after the draw for being found ineligible.

Pool 8

Pool 9

Pool 10

Pool 11

Pool 12

Pool 13

Knockout round

References

Men's Greco-Roman 74 kg